Gordon Hølmebakk (26 February 1928 – 10 January 2018) was a Norwegian publishing editor, essayist and novelist.

Biography
He was born in Feda, (now Kvinesdal) in Vest-Agder, Norway. He was the son of Søren Adolf Svindland (1881–1966) and Inger Marie Abrahamsen Møgedal (1888–1949). His brother was noted author, Sigbjørn Hølmebakk (1922-81).

He entered the University of Oslo in 1950 where he  came into contact with Harald Grieg, director of the publishing firm  Gyldendal Norsk Forlag.  Hølmebakk worked for Gyldendal from 1958. Hølmebakk soon came to assume responsibility  of the 
large number of translations from contemporary world literature in Den gule serie which Sigurd Hoel (1890-1960) had previously edited since 1929.
Hølmebakk edited a new series  in which many important avant-garde foreign authors were introduced in Norway.
Hølmebakk headed the section of translated fiction from 1960 to 1996 during which time Gyldendal published more translated books than did any other Norwegian publishing house. Hølmebakk also edited several book series and anthologies.

In 1955, he married Inger Sophie Blix Manthey. After his retirement he  wrote novels under the pseudonym Gabriel Homme.  In 1996, he wrote his autobiography, Den gode strid. In 1997 he was jointly awarded the Anders Jahre's Cultural Prize (Anders Jahres Kulturpris) with composer   Arne Nordheim (1931–2010).  He died during 2018 in Oslo, Norway.

References

1928 births
2018 deaths
People from Kvinesdal
Norwegian book publishers (people)
Norwegian essayists
20th-century Norwegian novelists
20th-century essayists